RFID is a wireless technology supported by many different vendors for tags (also called transponders or smart cards) and readers (also called interrogators or terminals). In order to ensure global operability of the products multiple test standards have been developed. Furthermore, standardization organizations like ETSI organize RFID Plugtests, where products from multiple vendors are tested against each other in order to ensure interoperability.

The most important test standards are 
ISO/IEC 10373-6 for conformance to ISO/IEC 14443
ISO/IEC 10373-7 for conformance to ISO/IEC 15693
ISO/IEC 18047  multiple parts for conformance to ISO/IEC 18000 multiple parts
ISO/IEC 18046  multiple parts for performance of ISO/IEC 18000 systems, interrogators and tags

Testing Equipment Vendors 
  CISC Semiconductor GmbH
 JX Instrumentation Ltd
 Voyantic Ltd

Testing Vendors 
 MET Laboratories, Inc.
 TRaC Global
 FIME
 Arsenal Testhouse

Reference list 

Radio-frequency identification